Md Ilias Ali (born 01 March 1960) is an Indian politician and is the ex member for the Dalgaon constituency in the Assam Legislative Assembly. Ali is a member of the Indian National Congress and a former Parliamentary Secretary of State.

Ali was elected a member of the Darrang Zila Parishad at the 2002 Assam panchayat elections. He was first elected to the Assam Legislative Assembly at the 2006 elections from the Dalgaon constituency as an Independent, where he received 41,871 votes, 5,685 votes ahead of his nearest rival. He was re-elected at the 2011 elections, securing 62280 votes (44.31% of the total vote), and at the 2016 elections, where he polled 76,607 votes (42.48% of the total vote) winning by a 2,320 vote margin. He was appointed Parliamentary secretary for the Minister of Irrigation in the Tarun Gogoi led government.

Positions held 

 President, Bahabari Gaon Panchayat, 1978.
 Honorary Deputy Advisor V.D.O. Darrang - 1982 to 1985.
 Chairman, Darrang District Regulated Marketing Committee 1992–1998.
 President (Elected), Fakirpara Gaon Panchayat 1992 to 1996.
 Elected Member Darrang Zilla Parishad 2002 to 2006.
 MLA 2006 to 2011 (12th Assembly)
 MLA 2011 to 2016 (13th Assembly)
MLA 2016 (14th Assembly)

References

Social media handles 
Facebook: https://www.facebook.com/iliasaliinc

Twitter: https://twitter.com/iliasaliinc?lang=en

1959 births
Assam MLAs 2006–2011
Assam MLAs 2011–2016
Living people
Indian National Congress politicians from Assam
Assam MLAs 2016–2021